Ethmia terminella is a moth of the family Depressariidae. It was described by Thomas Bainbrigge Fletcher in 1838 and is found in Europe.

The moth flies from May to July depending on the location.

The larvae feed on Echium vulgare.

Two subspecies have been described:
 Ethmia terminella terminella – most of range
 Ethmia terminella micropunctella Amsel, 1955 – Jordan

External links
 "Vijfpuntzwartwitmot - Ethmia terminella (T.B. Fletcher, 1938)". Waarneming.nl.  Retrieved March 20, 2018. 

terminella
Moths of Europe
Insects of Turkey